Nettleton is a town in Lee and Monroe counties in Mississippi. The population was 1,935 at the 2020 census. Incorporated in 1888, the town was named after George Henry Nettleton, president of the Kansas City, Memphis and Birmingham Railroad (KCM&B).

Geography
Nettleton is located at  (34.088218, -88.622701). The town sits on the boundary line between Lee County on the north and Monroe County on the south, with approximately equal portions of the town in either county. In the 2000 census, 1,196 of the town's 1,932 residents (61.9%) lived in Monroe County and 736 (38.1%) in Lee County.

According to the United States Census Bureau, the town has a total area of 2.7 square miles (7.0 km), of which 2.7 square miles (7.0 km) is land and 0.37% is water.

Demographics

2020 census

As of the 2020 United States Census, there were 1,935 people, 808 households, and 551 families residing in the city.

2000 census
As of the census of 2000, there were 1,932 people, 794 households, and 546 families residing in the town. The population density was 714.8 people per square mile (276.3/km). There were 868 housing units at an average density of 321.1 per square mile (124.1/km). The racial makeup of the town was 66.56% White, 32.51% African American, 0.10% Native American, 0.36% Asian, 0.16% from other races, and 0.31% from two or more races. Hispanic or Latino of any race were 0.36% of the population.

There were 794 households, out of which 31.5% had children under the age of 18 living with them, 47.5% were married couples living together, 17.5% had a female householder with no husband present, and 31.2% were non-families. 28.8% of all households were made up of individuals, and 14.9% had someone living alone who was 65 years of age or older. The average household size was 2.43 and the average family size was 3.00.

In the town, the population was spread out, with 26.3% under the age of 18, 8.1% from 18 to 24, 26.8% from 25 to 44, 23.9% from 45 to 64, and 14.9% who were 65 years of age or older. The median age was 37 years. For every 100 females, there were 85.4 males. For every 100 females age 18 and over, there were 76.7 males.

The median income for a household in the town was $25,951, and the median income for a family was $31,510. Males had a median income of $26,220 versus $18,974 for females. The per capita income for the town was $12,006. About 16.8% of families and 20.8% of the population were below the poverty line, including 20.3% of those under age 18 and 30.9% of those age 65 or over.

Education
The Town of Nettleton is served by the Nettleton School District.

After high school, many of the students attend the Itawamba Community College in Fulton, Ms.

Notable people
 Fred Beckett, jazz trombone player
 Jason Ferguson – professional Football player
 Bill Hall – former Major League Baseball player
 Brandon Presley – politician
 Jim Price, former American Football League linebacker
 Paul Thorn - singer/songwriter

References

Towns in Lee County, Mississippi
Towns in Monroe County, Mississippi
Towns in Mississippi
Towns in Tupelo micropolitan area